Lethotremus is a monospecific genus of marine ray-finned fish belonging to the family Cyclopteridae, the lumpfishes or lumpsuckers. This genus is found in the northern Pacific Ocean. Following a 2017 taxonomic review by Lee et al., the species Lethotremus awae was reclassified as a species of Eumicrotremus, leaving the genus monotypic with Lethotremus muticus as its only species.

References

Cyclopteridae
Fish described in 1896
Taxa named by Charles Henry Gilbert